Fadime Helvacioglu (born 24 May 1979) is a German taekwondo practitioner from Bielefeld. 

She competed at the 2000 Summer Olympics in Sydney.

References

External links

1979 births
Living people
Sportspeople from Bielefeld
German female taekwondo practitioners
Olympic taekwondo practitioners of Germany
Taekwondo practitioners at the 2000 Summer Olympics